George Page may refer to:

People 
George Page (alpine skier) (1910–?), American alpine skier
George Page (Australian footballer) (1905–1974), Australian rules footballer
George Page (footballer, born 1898) (1898–19??), English football fullback active in the 1920s
George Page (mayor) (1878–1972), mayor of Nelson, New Zealand, 1935–1941
George Page (television presenter) (1935–2006), American TV host
George A. Page Jr., U.S. aircraft designer, designer of the Curtiss-Wright C-46 Commando
George C. Page (1901–1999), American businessman
George E. Page (1873–1959), Wisconsin Republican legislator
George True Page (1859–1941), American federal judge
George Page (chess player) (1890–1953), Scottish chess master

Ship 
CSS George Page, steamship built 1853

Page, George